G10, G.X or G-10 or Group of Ten may refer to:

 Canon PowerShot G10
 G10 (agricultural), ten countries which are "vulnerable" to imports due to ongoing reform in the agricultural sector
 G10 (engine), Suzuki
 G10 (material), a type of lightweight insulating material commonly used in knife handles
 G10 currencies, the 10 most heavily traded currencies in the world
 G-10 Law, the German privacy law Gesetz zur Beschränkung des Brief-, Post- und Fernmeldegeheimnisses 
 G10 Suifenhe–Manzhouli Expressway, China
 Group of Ten (economics), a group originally of ten, now eleven, industrial nations
 Solidaires Unitaires Démocratiques, a group of 10 different French trade unions
 A Samsung Sens laptop computer model